A New Chapter is the second album from Australian pop singer Anthony Callea. It features the singles "Live for Love" and "Addicted to You", both of which Callea performed at popular morning show Sunrise. Callea co-wrote fourteen of the fifteen songs over a year. The album runs a length of just over an hour, containing many more upbeat and rocky songs in comparison with his self-titled debut.

A New Chapter features two exclusive tracks entitled "Whatever It Takes" (originally recorded by Edyta Górniak for the album Invisible) and "Meant for Love" when purchased digitally, which didn't make the album's final cut. "Meant for Love" instead appeared on the "Addicted to You" single, along with "Try" and another iTunes-exclusive track "Far from Over". The album debuted at #9 on the ARIA Albums Chart, and was certified Gold by ARIA.

Track listing

Charts

Certifications

References

New Chapter, A
Anthony Callea albums